Carcasse is the French language word for carcass.  It may refer to:

Places
Carcasse, British Indian Ocean Territory
Carcasse, Haiti

Other
Carcasse (film), a 2007 film